11 Serpentis is a single star in the constellation of Serpens, located 271 light years away from the Sun. It has the Bayer designation A1 Serpentis, 11 Serpentis is the Flamsteed designation. This object is visible to the naked eye as a faint, orange-hued star with an apparent visual magnitude of 5.497. It is moving closer to the Earth with a heliocentric radial velocity of −16 km/s.

This is an aging giant star with a stellar classification of K0 III, a star that has used up its core hydrogen and has expanded. It is a red clump giant on the horizontal branch, which indicates it is generating energy through the fusion of helium at its core. 11 Serpentis is 2.75 billion years old with 1.3 times the mass of the Sun and has 11 times the Sun's radius. It is radiating 50 times the Sun's luminosity from its enlarged photosphere at an effective temperature of 4,767 K.

References

K-type giants
Horizontal-branch stars
Serpens (constellation)
Serpentis, A1
Durchmusterung objects
Serpentis, 11
138562
076133
5772